Chennai 600028 II is a 2016 Indian Tamil-language sports comedy film co-produced, written and directed by Venkat Prabhu, who also produces the film along with S. P. B. Charan under Black Ticket Company and Capital Film Works. The film, which is a sequel to Chennai 600028 (2007), features Vaibhav in a prominent role in addition to several cast members from the earlier film including Jai, Shiva, Premji, Aravind Akash, Inigo Prabakaran and Nithin Sathya. The film's score and soundtrack is composed by Yuvan Shankar Raja. The film was released on 9 December 2016 to positive reviews and performed well at the box office.

Plot
Karthik (Shiva) is married to his girlfriend Selvi (Vijayalakshmi), so are Pazhani (Nithin Sathya) and Gopi (Vijay Vasanth). Raghu (Jai) is in love and is attempting to convince his girlfriend Anu’s (Sana Althaf) parents to accept him. Seenu (Premji), who had previously owned the tiny neighbourhood grocery store, is now the proud owner of a supermarket. He is single and keeps the group together with his never-ending booze parties, antagonizing the wives who blame him for their husbands's wayward ways. Despite the frequent fights at home, the group is still in touch and deeply care about each other. Meanwhile Raghu’s marriage is fixed. Though reluctant initially, Anu’s parents want her to be happy. Everyone is invited to their village, where the wedding celebrations are slated to go on for a week. It is in this picturesque village in Theni district that the friends are thrown back into their former life, when everything revolved around cricket and the beautiful bond of friendship. A midnight bachelor’s party goes horribly wrong with Raghu found in a compromising position with one of the dancers. The wedding is called off. How this entire complicated mess is sorted out with a series of very interesting nail-biting cricket matches forms the rest of the story.

Cast
{{cast listing|
 Jai as Raghuvaran "Raghu"
 Vaibhav as Marudhu Pandi "Marudhu"
 Shiva as Karthik "Naan 
 Premji Amaran as Seenivasan "Seenu" Aravind Akash as Aravind
 Inigo Prabakaran as John
 Vijay Vasanth as Gopi
 Nithin Sathya as Pazhani
 Ajay Raj as Ezhumalai
 Mahat Raghavendra as Oor Kaavalan "OK" Abhinay Vaddi as Ganeshan, Maruthupandi's friend 
 Sundar as Rockers Jeeva 
 Ilavarasu as Manohar, Manager of Chennai Sharks and owner of barber shop
 T. Siva as Rajamanikkam, Anu's father 
 Subbu Panchu as Chidambaram, Anu's uncle
 Sana Althaf as Anuradha "Anu", Raghu's fiance
 Vijayalakshmi as Selvi, Karthik's wife and Pazhani's sister
 Anjena Kirti as Poonam, Gopi's wife 
 Krithika Laddu as Uma, Pazhani's wife and ezhumalai's sister
 Maheshwari Chanakyan as Stella ezhumalai's wife
 Shanmugasundaram as Minister of Sports
 Santhana Bharathi as Chellaiya, Arvind and OK's boss 
 Viraj as Hari, captain of 'Bad Boys' team
 Karthik as Arivazhagan "Arivu"
 Sachu as Anu's grandmother
 S. N. Surendar as Sampath, Raghu's father
 Srilatha as Durga, Raghu's mother
 Manisha Yadav as Soppana Sundari
 Shanthini Mathivanan
 Kiran Konda as Vetri
 Vatsan Chakravarthy as Cheenu
 Lallu as Cricket player
 Gangai Amaran in a special appearance as Seenu's father
 Sakthi Saravanan in a special appearance as Police inspector
 Kalyan in a special appearance in 'Soppana Sundari' song
 RJ Vigneshkanth as Cricket commentator 
 Prashanth Rangaswamy as Cricket commentator 
 Badava Gopi as Cricket commentator Badava Gopi
Akash Premkumar
}}

 Production 
Plans of making a sequel to Chennai 600028 have been reported several times in the media, first in 2007 shortly after the film's release. In 2009, Indiaglitz.com reported that Venkat Prabhu and producer S. P. B. Charan would join together in 2010 to start the second part with a "top slot mass hero", while Charan reiterated the same in an interview later. In 2011, sources said that a sequel to Chennai 28 had been planned earlier but was not "on cards as of now". In 2012, Venkat Prabhu again expressed interest in making a sequel, stating "I personally love to do Chennai- 28 with the tagline Second Innings". This was confirmed after production of the film was officially unveiled on 28 February 2016.

Abhinay Vaddi, who had previously appeared in Ramanujan'' (2014), revealed that he had signed on to portray a negative role in the film and would sport a thick beard and moustache for his character. Subbu Panchu also announced that he had signed the film during March 2016, while actress Anjena Kirti was brought into portray Vijay Vasanth's love interest. Actor Viraj who appeared in the first film as a small boy, reprised his role in this film.

Release
The satellite rights of the film were sold to STAR Vijay.

Soundtrack

References

External links

2016 films
2010s Tamil-language films
Films directed by Venkat Prabhu
Films scored by Yuvan Shankar Raja
Indian sequel films
Indian sports comedy films
Films about cricket in India
Films shot in Tirunelveli
2010s sports comedy films
2016 comedy films